Euclid Avenue Historic District is a national historic district located at Bristol, Virginia. The district encompasses 573 contributing buildings and 3 contributing structures in a predominantly residential area of Bristol. The neighborhood developed in the late-19th and early-20th centuries, and contains primarily one- to two-story frame and brick dwellings constructed from 1890 through the 1940s. Notable buildings include the William G. Lindsey House (c. 1890), Euclid Avenue Baptist Church (1928), R.C. Horner House (1930), architect Clarence B. Kearfott House, James Cecil House, and the dwelling at 611 Arlington Avenue, which is the only example of a Lustron house known to exist in Bristol. The Virginia High School (1914) is separately listed.

It was listed on the National Register of Historic Places in 2006.

References

National Register of Historic Places in Bristol, Virginia
Buildings and structures in Bristol, Virginia
Historic districts on the National Register of Historic Places in Virginia